Maharani Krishna Bai Holkar or Maji Keshri Bai (died September 1849) was the regent of the Indian Princely Indore State between 1843 and 1849. She served as regent during the minority of her adoptive son Maharajadhiraja  Raj Rajeshwar Sawai Shri Khanderao Holkar in 1843-1844, and for his successor Tukoji Rao II Holkar XI in 1844-1849.

Life
She was a pottery maker before she became the harem concubine of Jaswantrao Holkar VI Subadar Bahadur, Maharaja of Indore (r. 1799-1811), whom she never formally married. She became the mother of Malhar Rao Holkar III (r. 1811-1833).

See also
Holkar

References

 https://guide2womenleaders.com/womeninpower/Womeninpower1840.htm
 J. W. Bond, Arnold Wright, Indian States: A Biographical, Historical, and Administrative Survey

Holkar
Year of birth unknown
Indian female royalty
19th-century women rulers
1849 deaths